Just a Little may refer to:
"Just a Little" (The Beau Brummels song), 1965
"Just a Little" (Liberty X song), 2002

See also
Just a Little Bit (disambiguation)